The least dwarf shrew (Suncus infinitesimus) is a species of mammal in the family Soricidae. It is found in Cameroon, Central African Republic, Democratic Republic of the Congo, Kenya, Nigeria, South Africa, Eswatini, Tanzania, and Uganda. Its natural habitats are tropical or subtropical moist lowland and montane forests, dry grassland, and arable land.

References

Suncus
Taxonomy articles created by Polbot
Mammals described in 1912